Centrolepis glabra, commonly known as smooth centrolepis, is a species of plant in the Restionaceae family.

It blooms between September and November.

In Western Australia it is found among granite outcrops, in winter wet depressions and around swamps in the Peel, Wheatbelt, South West and Great Southern regions where it grows in sandy clay soils.

References

glabra
Plants described in 1873
Flora of Western Australia
Poales of Australia
Taxa named by Ferdinand von Mueller